Marquess of Torre Soto de Briviesca, commonly known as Marquess of Torre Soto, is a hereditary title in the Peerage of Spain, granted in 1918 by Alfonso XIII to Pedro Nolasco, knight of the Order of Charles III and Gentilhombre of the king.

Marquesses of Torre Soto de Briviesca (1918)

Pedro Nolasco y González de Soto, 1st Marquess of Torre Soto de Briviesca (1849-1946)
Pedro Nolasco y Gordon, 2nd Marquess of Torre Soto de Briviesca (1878-1967), son of the 1st Marquess
Pedro Nolasco y Díez, 3rd Marquess of Torre Soto de Briviesca (1912-2014), son of the 2nd Marquess
Pedro Nolasco y López de Carrizosa, 4th Marquess of Torre Soto de Briviesca, son of the 3rd Marquess

See also
Jerez de la Frontera

References

Marquesses of Spain
Lists of Spanish nobility
Noble titles created in 1918